Thomas M. Purtell was an American politician from Wisconsin.

Purtell served as State Treasurer of Wisconsin from July 30, 1904 until January 2, 1905. On August 30, 1904, Robert M. La Follette, Sr. Governor of Wisconsin removed John J. Kempf from office and appointed Purtell acting treasurer.

Notes

State treasurers of Wisconsin